Battle of the Shaer gas field may refer to:
 Battle of the Shaer gas field (July 2014).
 Battle of the Shaer gas field (October–November 2014).
 Battle of the Shaer gas field (2016).